Yin-Yang is the third album released by Victor Wooten.

The track "Pretty Little Lady" has a vocal line that was recorded backwards and then played in reverse, so that it appears to sound normal. This is an example of phonetic reversal.

There is a video of the recording of "Zenergy" and "Resolution" found on Victor Wooten and Carter Beauford "Making Music".

Track listing

Disc one - instrumental
"Imagine This" (V. Wooten) – 5:08
"Yinin' & Yangin'" instrumental (V. Wooten) – 4:36
"Hip Bop" (V. Wooten) – 4:03
"Joe's Journey" (V. Wooten) – 5:20
"The Urban Turban" (V. Wooten) – 2:42
"Tali Lama" (V. Wooten) – 5:17
"Zenergy" (Béla Fleck, Carter Beauford, V. Wooten) – 6:46
"Kaila Speaks" (Future Man, V. Wooten) – 3:00
"Sacred Place" (V. Wooten) – 3:46
"Resolution" (Carter Beauford, V. Wooten) – 4:57

Disc two - instrumental and vocal
"Hormones in the Headphones" (Michael Kott) – 4:06
"Yinin' & Yangin'" vocal version (J.D. Blair, Dwight Farrell, Jonathan Morse, V. Wooten) – 4:12
"Kaila Raps" (V. Wooten) - 4:42
"One" (V. Wooten) – 4:54
"What Crime Is It?" (J.D. Blair, Bootsy Collins, William Collins II, V. Wooten) – 4:55
"Go Girl Go" (Michael Kott) – 3:18
"Pretty Little Lady" (V. Wooten) – 3:34
"Hero" (Future Man) – 4:42
"Singing My Song" (V. Wooten) – 4:43
"Think About That" (V. Wooten) – 4:09

Personnel
Victor Wooten - bass guitar, cello, programming, background vocals, acoustic bass, electric upright bass
Steve Bailey - bass
Carter Beauford - drums
J.D. Blair - drums, vocals, drum programming
David Blazer - cello
Kathy Chiavola - vocals
Jeff Coffin - tenor saxophone
Bootsy Collins - vocals
Billy Contreras - violin
Count Bass D - rap
Stuart Duncan - fiddle
Tabitha Fair - vocals
Béla Fleck - banjo
Joseph Wooten - organ, piano, keyboards, theremin, background vocals
Aseem Hetep - vocals
Michael Kott - cello, background vocals
Park Law - vocals
Rod McGaha - trumpet
Jonathan Morse - background vocals
Jonell Mosser - vocals
Jim Roberts - djembe, shaker
Peter Rowan - vocals
Buddy Spicher - violin, viola
Kurt Storey - violin
Allyson Taylor - vocals
Kirk Whalum - soprano saxophone, tenor saxophone
Roger "Rock" Williams - soprano saxophone
Dorothy G. Wooten - vocals
Holly Wooten - background vocals
Kaila Wooten - vocals
Regi Wooten - acoustic guitar, guitar, wah-wah guitar
Rudy Wooten - saxophone
Kelly Gravely  -  drums (Imagine This, Tali Llama, Pretty Little Lady)

References

1999 albums
Victor Wooten albums